The Board of Intermediate and Secondary Education, Bahawalpur is a board of Punjab located in Bahawalpur.

Jurisdiction 

Jurisdiction of Bahawalpur board includes the following districts:
 Bahawalpur District
 Bahawalnagar District
 Rahim Yar Khan District

See also 
 List of educational boards in Pakistan
 Federal Board of Intermediate and Secondary Education

External links
 Official website of BISE Bahawalpur

Bahawalpur